Dragutin Vabec, most commonly known as Drago Vabec (born 26 October 1950 in Zagreb, SFR Yugoslavia) is a Croatian left winger who played for SFR Yugoslavia, Dinamo Zagreb and Stade Brestois. He is considered one of the best players in Dinamo Zagreb history and the best player in Stade Brestois history. He left Brest in 1983.

His family originates from Čakovec, Međimurje County, and he spent most of his time there.

Playing career

International
Vabec made his debut for Yugoslavia in a September 1973 friendly match against Hungary and earned a total of 7 caps, scoring 1 goal. His final international was an April 1976 European Championship qualification match against Wales. While playing for Yugoslavia during a match against Sweden on 10 October 1975 he scored a fantastic goal, which was for years screened at the beginning of the sports program.

Playing style
Although Vabec played mostly as a left winger, he was an excellent right winger too, and could also play at a high level as a midfielder or a defender. The football experts deem him the most versatile player in Dinamo's history. Vabec was described as a highly intelligent player, with superb technique and passing skills, and equally adept with both feet.

Managerial career
In October 2006, he was appointed head coach at relegation-threatened Croatian second division side NK Čakovec. He remained at the position until the end of the season, but failed to save the club from relegation.

References

External links
 
Drago Vabec profile at the Serbia national football team website 
NASL stats
Biography in the Croatian Football Lexicon
 

1950 births
Living people
Sportspeople from Čakovec
Footballers from Zagreb
Association football forwards
Association football wingers
Yugoslav footballers
Yugoslavia international footballers
GNK Dinamo Zagreb players
Toronto Blizzard (1971–1984) players
Stade Brestois 29 players
Yugoslav First League players
North American Soccer League (1968–1984) players
Ligue 1 players
Yugoslav expatriate footballers
Expatriate soccer players in Canada
Yugoslav expatriate sportspeople in Canada
Expatriate footballers in France
Yugoslav expatriate sportspeople in France
Yugoslav football managers